The Velodrome Rakyat is a velodrome in Ipoh, Malaysia, and was the first velodrome to be built in that country.

Tan Sri Dato' Seri Darshan Singh Gill, President of the Perak Cycling Association, identified the need for a velodrome in the country. Previously, the National Cycling Federation used to send track cyclists to neighbouring countries at a very high cost. With the approval of Sultan Azlan Shah of Perak, Darshan led a nationwide public donation drive and collected RM 3.25 million for the project.

Velodrome Rakyat is a 250-metre timber track, and has hosted many national and international events, including the World Cycling Championships B in 1997, the Track World Cup in 2000 and 2001, and the cycling events of the 1989 Southeast Asian Games.

See also
 Sport in Malaysia
 Nilai Velodrome

External links
 information at FixedGearFever.com

Velodromes in Malaysia
Cycle racing in Malaysia
Buildings and structures in Ipoh
Sports venues in Perak